Calkain Companies was a company that provided services, primarily brokerage, to the commercial real estate industry. It was based in Herndon, Virginia and focused on buildings that were leased to single tenants. In February 2020, the company was dissolved and its employees joined Avison Young.

History
After working in commercial property for over 20 years, Jonathan Hipp founded Calkain Companies in 2005.

In January 2013, the company brokered the sale of 7 stores in Orlando and central Florida leased to Applebee's for $18.5 million.

In June 2014, Calkain brokered the sale of a store leased to CVS Health in Tysons Corner for $27.4 million, or $1,915 per square foot, the highest net lease sales price in the Washington metropolitan area. Calkain held the previous record with a sale of a store leased to Starbucks in Washington, D.C. for $1,672 per square foot.

In December 2018, the company listed a store in Adams Morgan leased to Wawa.

In September 2019, the company brokered the sale of a CVS in Cleveland Park for $15 million, or $1,714 per square foot.

In February 2020, the company was dissolved and the employees joined Avison Young.

References

2020 disestablishments in Virginia
Real estate companies disestablished in 2020
Real estate companies established in 2005